Theodosians can refer to:
The Theodosian dynasty of Roman Emperors
In Christianity:
the supporters of Pope Theodosius I of Alexandria
the Feodocci, a branch of the Raskolniks